Masquerade (lit. Gwanghae: The Man Who Became King) is a 2012 South Korean period drama film starring Lee Byung-hun in dual role as the bizarre King Gwanghae and the humble acrobat Ha-sun, who stands in for the monarch when he faces the threat of being poisoned.

With 12.3 million tickets sold, Masquerade is the ninth highest-grossing South Korean film. Also, it swept the 49th Grand Bell Awards, winning in 15 categories, including Best Film, Director, Screenplay and Actor.

Plot
The confusing and conspiratorial 15th ruler of Korea's Joseon Dynasty King Gwang-hae (Lee Byung-hun) orders his Secretary of Defense, Heo Gyun (Ryu Seung-ryong), to find him a double in order to avoid the constant threat of assassination. In constant fear of being poisoned, the king becomes obnoxious and threatens everyone around him, including the kitchen maids. Heo gyun finds Ha-sun, a lowly acrobat and bawdy joker who looks remarkably like the king to replace the king occasionally whenever the king is out of the palace. In few days, just as feared, King Gwang-hae is drugged with Poppy by his favorite consort, conspired by the law minister. Heo Gyun proposes Ha-sun fill the role as the king until King Gwang-hae fully recovers and grooms Ha-sun to look and act like the king. While assuming the role of the king at his first official appearance, Ha-sun begins to ponder the intricacies of the problems debated in his court. Being fundamentally more humanitarian than King Gwang-hae, Ha-sun's affection and appreciation of even the most minor servants slowly changes morale in the palace for the better. Over time he finds his voice and takes control of governing the country with real insight and fair judgments. Even Heo Gyun and the Chief Eunuch are moved by Ha-sun's genuine concern for the people, and realize he is a better ruler than Gwang-hae. Ha-sun even fights for the respect of the Queen's safety and protects her and her brother from death sentences.  However, his chief opposition, Park Chung-seo (Kim Myung-gon), notices the sudden shift in the king's behavior and starts to ask questions. The queen (Han Hyo-joo) is also conflicted between the real king and the fake king's secret. The Chief Eunuch and the Secretary of Defense ask Ha-sun to leave the country for good. The king was again brought back to the throne to punish the revolts.

Cast

Lee Byung-hun as King Gwanghae/Ha-sun
Ryu Seung-ryong as Chief Secretary Heo Gyun
Han Hyo-joo as Queen Consort Yoo 
Jang Gwang as Chief Eunuch Jo
Kim In-kwon as Captain Do, the king's personal bodyguard
Shim Eun-kyung as Sa-wol, a food taster
Park Ji-a as Chief Court Lady Han
Shin Jung-geun as Lee Jung-rang
Kim Myung-gon as Interior Minister Park Chung-seo
Jeon Guk-hyang as Court Lady Jeong
Yang Joon-mo as Kim Joo-seo
Moon Chang-gil as the Left state councillors
Jeon Bae-soo as Hyung-pan
Do Yong-goo as Byung-pan
Yoo Soon-woong as Ho-pan
Lee Yang-hee as Gong-pan
Park Kyung-geun as a musician
Shin Woon-sup as Ye-pan
Kim Jong-goo as Gwanghae's royal physician
Lee El as Lady Ahn Gae-shi
Lee Joon-hyuk as a Lord
Seo Jin-won as General Overseer Do
Kim Hye-won as Courtesan Pearl
Kim Hak-joon as Yoo Jung-ho, Queen Yoo's father
Kim Hye-hwa as Plum Blossom Pot servant
Kim Seung-hoon as Yi-bang
Lee Bong-ryun as court woman 1
Kwon Bang-hyun as court woman 2
Lee Ran-hee as court woman 3
Lee Soo-yong as Kal Ja-gook
Kim Gil-dong as a Military officer
Kwon Eun-soo as Gwanghae's court lady	
Seo Eun-jung as Gwanghae's court lady
Joo Young-ho as Gwanghae's astrologist 1
Jo Sung-hee as Gwanghae's astrologist 2
Min Jung-gi as Gwanghae's eunuch
Kim Bi-bi as Queen Yoo's maid

Background
Historically, Gwanghae, the 15th Joseon king from 1608 to 1623, attempted diplomacy through neutrality as China's Ming Dynasty (1368-1644) and Qing Dynasty (1636-1912) set their sights on the country. He also tried his hand at other reforms and reconstruction to try to make the nation prosperous, including an emphasis on the restoration of documents, but met with opposition and was later deposed and exiled to Jeju Island. Since he was deposed in a coup by the Westerners faction, historians did not give him a temple name like Taejo or Sejong.

The premise behind the film is an interpretation of the missing 15 days in the Seungjeongwon ilgi or Journal of the Royal Secretariat during Gwanghae's reign—designated by his 1616 journal entry, "One must not record that which he wishes to hide." That premise is entirely fictitious in nature. This is because
 The Journal in itself is largely incomplete due to records being destroyed several times and reproductions of the destroyed documents also eventually being destroyed, leading to large missing chunks of records or questionable reproductions that may or may not have been edited every subsequent reproduction.
 Relevant records written during the reign of Gwanghae are also largely missing.
 Even if the Journal were complete, it is highly unlikely the Secretariat would delete or omit records, even by order of the King due to protocol. In fact, due to that same protocol the only thing that would happen is that after having received word or having witnessed a certain incident and subsequently ordered to not record it, the Secretariat would record the incident in full and finish the entry stating the King ordered him not to do so.
 A prime example of the above would be when Taejong fell off his horse when hunting one day and asked the Secretariat to not record this in the journal. The Secretariat however went and recorded the incident and ended his entry with 'and His Majesty asked that the Secretariat not record this'

Production
Announced in early 2011 and initially titled I am the King of Joseon, The Prince and the Pauper-inspired historical film was to be directed by Kang Woo-suk and star Jung Jae-young as Gwanghae/Ha-sun and Yoo Jun-sang as Heo Gyun, but Kang left the project over differences of opinion with production firm CJ E&M.

In November 2011, they were replaced by director Choo Chang-min and actor Lee Byung-hun in his first ever historical film. A month later, Han Hyo-joo was cast as Lee's co-star.

The film was shot at the Namyangju Studio Complex in Gyeonggi Province.

Reception
Called by one review as one of the best South Korean costume dramas in years, the film drew praise for being beautifully written and emotionally involving, as well as for its accomplished acting, sure-handed direction, ambitious scale and commercial appeal. It became the second biggest hit film at the 2012 South Korean box office, attracting 8.2 million admissions in 25 days of release, then 9,091,633 after 31 days. On its 38th day, it became the 7th film in Korean cinema history to surpass the 10 million-milestone attendance. At the end of its theatrical run it was listed as Korea's all-time third highest-grossing film with 12,319,542 tickets sold nationwide (as of April 2015, it is currently sixth).

Adaptations

In theater 
The film was adapted into a stage play which ran at Seoul's Dongsoong Art Center from February 23 to April 21, 2013. It was produced by Lee Byung-hun's agency BH Entertainment. Bae Soo-bin and musical theatre actor Kim Do-hyun alternated in the lead role of Gwanghae. As part of the promotion for the play, Lee, Bae and Kim were featured in a photo spread in the inaugural issue of Grazia Korea, published on February 20, 2013.

In television

Cable network tvN acquired rights for a television adaptation, starring Yeo Jin-goo. Developed for the station by Studio Dragon and produced by GT:st, it is to air in January 2019.

In other media

South Korean rapper Agust D draws from the film in his 2020 track Daechwita. The lyrics reference King Gwanghae, as well as rising through the ranks from poverty and servitude to become a king, while in the accompanying music video Agust D portrays a scarred Joseon tyrant, confronted by a modern doppelganger.

Awards and nominations

See also
I Am a King
Prem Ratan Dhan Payo

Notes

References

External links
 
 
 
 
 
 Masquerade at Naver 

2012 films
2010s historical drama films
South Korean historical drama films
South Korean political drama films
Films about politicians
Films based on The Prince and the Pauper
Films set in the 15th century
Films set in the Joseon dynasty
Films set in Seoul
Films directed by Choo Chang-min
Best Picture Grand Bell Award winners
2010s Korean-language films
CJ Entertainment films
Gwanghaegun of Joseon
2012 drama films
2010s political drama films
2010s South Korean films